Head boy and head girl are student leadership roles in schools, representing the school's entire student body. They are normally the most senior prefects in the school. The terms are commonly used in the British education system as well as in schools throughout the Commonwealth. Some schools use alternative titles such as school captain.

Head boys and head girls are usually responsible for representing the school at events, and will make public speeches. They also serve as a role model for students, and may share pupils' ideas with the school's leadership. They may also be expected to lead fellow prefects in their duties. Deputy head boys and girls may also be appointed. Some schools in the UK no longer use the titles of head boy and head girl, and now have a role of "head pupil".

See also

Hall monitor

References

Role status
School terminology
Students in the United Kingdom
Terms for men
Terms for women
Girls
Boys